Kevin McKidd (born 9 August 1973) is a Scottish actor and television director. Before playing the role of Dr. Owen Hunt in Grey's Anatomy, for which he is widely known, McKidd appeared as Tommy Mackenzie in Danny Boyle's Trainspotting (1996), Count Vronsky in the BBC miniseries Anna Karenina (2000), Lucius Vorenus in the historical drama series Rome (2005–2007) and Dan Vasser in the NBC series Journeyman (2007). He provided the voice of John "Soap" MacTavish in the video games Call of Duty: Modern Warfare 2 and Call of Duty: Modern Warfare 3. He also played Poseidon in the film Percy Jackson & the Olympians: The Lightning Thief, and Father Deegan in the Father Ted Christmas special.

Early life
McKidd was born on 9 August 1973, in Elgin, Moray, the son of Kathleen, a secretary, and Neil McKidd, a plumber. He grew up in a council estate in Elgin. At 17, McKidd worked at the Macallan distillery in Speyside. He later went to work with the Lumsden family of coppersmiths. He attended Seafield Primary School and Elgin Academy. and was a member of the local amateur dramatic group, Moray Youth Theatre. Planning to study engineering, he initially attended the University of Edinburgh, then decided to audition at Edinburgh's Queen Margaret University where he was accepted to study Drama. He joined Edinburgh University's student theatre company, Bedlam Theatre, where he was a member of the improvisational comedy troupe The Improverts.

Career
After playing Tommy Mackenzie in Trainspotting, McKidd was cast as Father Deegan in the 1996 Christmas episode of Father Ted. Subsequent roles include Malky Johnson in Small Faces. In 2004, he played James Hepburn, 4th Earl of Bothwell, the third husband of Mary, Queen of Scots, in the BBC mini-series Gunpowder, Treason & Plot.

In 1999, he was part of an ensemble cast in Mike Leigh's Topsy Turvy, depicting the development of Gilbert and Sullivan's The Mikado. The actors researched their historical characters and used this knowledge during extensive rehearsals to help develop dialogue for scenes blocked out by Leigh. McKidd, like the rest of the cast, did his own singing in the Gilbert and Sullivan operettas portrayed in the film.

In 2001, he played Elliot in the British film Understanding Jane, directed by Caleb Lindsay. He appeared in Ridley Scott's Kingdom of Heaven, and in the 2002 film adaptation of Nicholas Nickleby. In Neil Marshall's horror film Dog Soldiers, he appeared as Pte Lawrence Cooper. In the 2005 BBC drama, The Virgin Queen, he played Thomas Howard, 4th Duke of Norfolk.

In 1998, McKidd was in the four part BBC2 series Looking After Jo Jo, playing the role of Basil. He was also one of the main stars of the joint HBO/BBC series Rome, where his portrayal of the soldier-politician Lucius Vorenus received critical acclaim.

McKidd starred in the premiere of Caryl Churchill's newest play, Far Away. He played Todd, the romantic partner of Joan, and her co-worker as hat maker.

Additional work includes his role in the Silence of the Lambs prequel Hannibal Rising (2007). In late 2007, McKidd began his role as the lead character in the American fantasy television series Journeyman on NBC. Despite starting out with a strong audience, the show lost about half of its viewership throughout its run and suffered from the fractious situation in the United States due to the writer's strike at the time. Thirteen episodes were produced.

His role in Rome led to McKidd's casting in the medical drama series Grey's Anatomy as Dr. Owen Hunt. He made his directorial debut in the series's seventh season, directing the episode "Don't Deceive Me (Please Don't Go)". He won the award for "Best Performance in a Drama Series Multi-Episode Storyline" at the 14th Prism Awards for his work in Grey's Anatomy. He played the role of Poseidon, god of the seas, and the father of Percy Jackson in Percy Jackson & the Olympians: The Lightning Thief.

McKidd has done voice work and voiced the character of Jezz Torrent, flame haired lead singer of the fictional Scottish hard rock band Love Fist in the video game Grand Theft Auto: Vice City. He is credited with playing a voice-over for the character John "Soap" MacTavish in Call of Duty: Modern Warfare 2 and Call of Duty: Modern Warfare 3. In 2012, he voiced the characters of Lord MacGuffin and his son Young MacGuffin in the Disney/Pixar film Brave. Having grown up in Elgin, McKidd used a variation of the Doric dialect for Young MacGuffin, and one of the running gags of his lines is that not even Lord MacGuffin is entirely sure what Young MacGuffin is saying.

Speyside Sessions
McKidd instigated The Speyside Sessions, a Scottish folk music album recorded in 2011/12 on Hogmanay in his home town of Elgin.  Many of the contributors to the album are old school friends of McKidd's.  The album was released on 15 June 2012 in aid of Save the Children.

Personal life
McKidd married Jane Parker in 1999. They have two children, a daughter and a son. In August 2015, McKidd and his family became U.S. citizens. The couple said in July 2016 that they were separating and have been divorced since December 2017.

McKidd married Arielle Goldrath in a Jewish ceremony on 13 January 2018. On 13 May 2018, they welcomed a son Aiden. McKidd announced that their daughter Nava was born 27 July 2019.

In April 2013, McKidd was Grand Marshal of the 15th annual Tartan Day Parade in New York City. At the time, he voiced his support for Scottish independence and expressed regret that he would be unable to vote in the then upcoming Scottish independence referendum the following year because he no longer lives in Scotland. Of Scottish independence, McKidd stated, "A lot of people think we're all gonna fall flat on our face if we do this. We're too feisty a people to let things turn bad if we went and tried it. Why not? Why not try at least?"

Filmography

Film

Television

As director
Grey's Anatomy (2010) Seattle Grace: Message of Hope (Webisodes)
 "No Comment" (14 October 2010)
 "Take One" (21 October 2010)
 "Award-Winning" (11 November 2010)
 "The Sizzle" (18 November 2010)
Grey's Anatomy (2011–present), television series
 "Don't Deceive Me (Please Don't Go)" (2011)
 "Poker Face" (2011)
 "Let the Bad Times Roll" (2012)
 "I Saw Her Standing There" (2012)
 "Do You Believe in Magic" (2013)
 "Two Against One" (2013)
 "I'm Winning" (2014)
 "I Must Have Lost it on the Wind" (2014)
 "Time Stops" (2015)
 "Sledgehammer" (2015)
 "Odd Man Out" (2016)
 "Mama Tried" (2016)
 "Catastrophe and the Cure" (2016)
 "Who Is He (And What Is He To You?)" (2017)
 "Till I Hear It From You" (2017)
 "True Colors" (2017)
 "Get Off on The Pain" (2017)
 "Out of Nowhere" (2017)
 "One Day Like This" (2018)
 "Bad Reputation" (2018)
 "Broken Together" (2018)
 "Blowin' In The Wind" (2018)
 "I Walk The Line" (2019)
 "Drawn to the Blood" (2019) 
 "Back in the Saddle" (2019)
 "Let's All Go to the Bar" (2019)
 "Give a Little Bit" (2020)
 "My Happy Ending" (2020)
 "In My Life" (2021)
 "Tradition" (2021)
 "Someone Saved My Life Tonight" (2021)
 "Some Kind of Tomorrow" (2021)
 "Legacy" (2022)
 "Put It to the Test" (2022)
 "Out for Blood" (2022)
 "Let's Talk About Sex" (2022)
 "Love Don’t Cost a Thing" (2023)
 "Pick Yourself Up" (2023)

Video games

References

External links

 
 
 

1973 births
Living people
20th-century Scottish male actors
20th-century Scottish male singers
21st-century Scottish male actors
21st-century Scottish male singers
Alumni of Queen Margaret University
Alumni of the University of Edinburgh
People educated at Elgin Academy, Moray
People from Elgin, Moray
People with acquired American citizenship
Scottish emigrants to the United States
Scottish male film actors
Scottish male stage actors
Scottish male television actors
Scottish male video game actors
Scottish male voice actors